Chorinea sylphina (sylphina angel) is a species of butterfly of the family Riodinidae. It is found in Ecuador, Peru, and Bolivia.

Adults fly in full sunshine, but occasionally settle beneath the leaves of bushes.

References

Riodinini
Butterflies described in 1868
Riodinidae of South America
Taxa named by Henry Walter Bates